Evidence Music is an American jazz and blues record label founded in 1992 by Howard Rosen and Jerry Gordon. The label's name comes from the song "Evidence" by Thelonious Monk.

The label's first releases were reissues of Sun Ra albums from the catalog of the Saturn label. The catalogue also includes Nat Adderley, Art Blakey, Gil Evans, Pharoah Sanders, and blues musicians Buddy Guy, Otis Rush, and Big Joe Turner.

Evidence has reissued recordings originally recorded and issued by the Bethlehem, Black and Blue, and Theresa labels.

See also
: Category:Evidence Music albums

References

External links

American record labels
Blues record labels
Jazz record labels